T47 is a  disability sport classification for disability athletics primarily for competitors with a below elbow or wrist amputation or impairment. T47 is a classification for track events but unlike the other T40 to T46 classifications it has no equivalent F47 classification for field events.  The amputee sports equivalent class is ISOD the A8 class.  People in this class can have injuries as a result of over use of their remaining upper limb.

Definition

This classification is for disability athletics. This classification is one of several classifications for athletes with ambulant related disabilities. Similar classifications are T40, T42, T43, T44, T45 and T46. As of 2016, the International Paralympic Committee defines this classification as being for athletes with a unilateral upper limb impairment resulting in some loss of function at the shoulder, elbow and wrist and which impacts sprints primarily. The impact of the impairment is comparable to the activity limitations experienced by an athlete with a unilateral through wrist/below elbow amputation.  This class includes people from the ISOD A8 class.

Disability groups

Amputees 
The nature of a person's amputations in this class can effect their physiology and sports performance. Because they are missing a limb, amputees are more prone to overuse injuries in their remaining limbs.  Common problems for intact upper limbs for people in this class include rotator cuffs tearing, shoulder impingement, epicondylitis and peripheral nerve entrapment.

A study was undertaken comparing the performance of athletics competitors at the 1984 Summer Paralympics when the ISOD classification system was in use. It found there was no significant difference in performance in times between women in A6, A7 and A8 in the discus, women in A6, A7 and A8 in the shot put, women in the A6, A7 and A8 in the long jump, women in A6, A7 and A8 in the 100 meter race, women in A5, A6, A7 and A8 in the 100 meter race, men in the A3, A4, A5, A6, A7, A8 and A9 in the discus, men in A6, A7 and A8 in the discus, men in A1, A2, A3, A4, A5, A6, A7, A8 and A9 in the javelin, men in A6, A7 and A8 in the javelin,  men in A8 and A9 in the shot put, men in A6, A7 and A8 in the high jump, men in A6, A7 and A8 in the long jump, men in A6, A7 and A8 in the 100 meter race, men in A7 and A8 in the 400 meter race, and men in A7 and A8 in the 1,500 meter race.

Performance and rules 
People in this class are not required to use a starting block.  They have an option to start from a standing position, a crouch or a 3-point stance. In relay events involving T40s classes, no baton is used.  Instead, a handoff takes place via touch in the exchange zone. People with arm amputations in this class can have elevated padded blocks to place their stumps on for the start of the race.  These blocks need to be in a neutral color or a color similar to that of the track, and they must be placed entirely behind the starting line.  Their location needs to be such that they do not interfere with the start of any other athlete.

In field events for this class, athletes are not required to wear a prosthetic.  In jumping events, athletes have 60 seconds during which they must complete their jump.  During this time, they can adjust their prosthetic. If during a jump the athlete's prosthesis falls off and lands closer to the takeoff board than the athlete, the mark is taken where the prosthesis landed. If prosthesis falls off outside the landing zone nearer the board than where athlete landed, the jump counts as a foul.

Events

History 

The classification was created by the International Paralympic Committee (IPC) and has roots in a 2003 attempt to address "the overall objective to support and co-ordinate the ongoing development of accurate, reliable, consistent and credible sport focused classification systems and their implementation." T47 was created in 2013 as an additional classification to the T45 and T46 classifications for competitors whose primary impairments are in the upper limbs.

For the 2016 Summer Paralympics in Rio de Janeiro, the IPC had a zero classification at the Games policy.  This policy was put into place in 2014, with the goal of avoiding last minute changes in classes that would negatively impact athlete training preparations. All competitors needed to be internationally classified with their classification status confirmed prior to the Games, with exceptions to this policy being dealt with on a case-by-case basis. In case there was a need for classification or reclassification at the Games despite best efforts otherwise, athletics classification was scheduled for September 4 and September 5 at Olympic Stadium.  For sportspeople with physical or intellectual disabilities going through  classification or reclassification in Rio, their in competition observation event is their first appearance in competition at the Games.

Becoming classified 
Classification is often based on the anatomical nature of the amputation. The classification system takes several things into account when putting people into this class; these include which limbs are affected, how many limbs are affected, and how much of a limb is missing.

For this class, classification generally has four phases. The first stage of classification is a health examination.  For amputees, this is often done on site at a sports training facility or competition.  The second stage is observation in practice, the third stage is observation in competition and the last stage is assigning the sportsperson to a relevant class. Sometimes the health examination may not be done on site because the nature of the amputation could cause not physically visible alterations to the body.

Competitors
Notable athletes in the T47 classification include South African sprinter Anrune Weyers and world record long jumper Carlee Beattie of Australia.

References

Parasports classifications